The 2013 Pomeroy Inn & Suites Prairie Showdown was held from March 14 to 17 at the Grande Prairie Curling Club in Grande Prairie, Alberta as part of the 2012–13 World Curling Tour. The men's event was held in a triple-knockout format, while the women's event was held in a round robin format.

Men

Teams
The teams are listed as follows:

Knockout results
The draw is listed as follows:

A event

B event

C event

Playoffs

Women

Teams
The teams are listed as follows:

Round Robin Standings
Final Round Robin Standings

Tiebreakers

Playoffs

References

External links

2013 in Canadian curling
Sport in Grande Prairie